Zinaida Vasilyevna Yershova (23 October 1904 — 25 April 1995) was a Soviet and Russian chemist, physicist and engineer. She spent her entire career working with radioactive elements and headed laboratories producing radioactive materials used mostly in the Soviet atomic bomb project and the Soviet space program.

Life and career
She was born in Moscow. After leaving school in 1923, she enrolled at Moscow State University in the faculty of Physics and Mathematics. She joined a radiochemical laboratory. In 1924, Vitaly Khlopin, deputy director of the recently started Radium Institute in Petrograd posted an advertisement aimed at university students in Moscow. From then, Yershova was under the supervision of and cooperated with Khlopin. Noticing her potential, he advised her to work at the Moscow Plant of Rare Elements, where radium was first produced in the Soviet Union industrially. She graduated from university in 1929.

In 1930, she began work as a specialist processing radium from the Tyuya-Muyun deposits (in Kyrgyzstan) and quickly became head of the physical laboratory. The first batches of radium produced by the young team were released in the winter of 1931, 200 milligrammes, 90% pure. In 1936, she was sent for an internship to the Marie Curie laboratory in Paris. Under Irène Joliot-Curie, she published a paper in 1937 in Journal de Physique: 'Estimation of the ratio uranium-238/uranium-235 in U-Y'. On the recommendation of Khlopin, she was sent to work at Giredmet (State Institute of Rare Metals) and was appointed head of the radium laboratory. When the Nazis invaded the Soviet Union in 1941, she was evacuated to Kazakhstan with her family.

In 1943, she was called back to Moscow urgently by the government. Physicist Igor Kurchatov, one of the leaders of the Soviet atomic project, asked her to produce uranium carbide and uranium metal; this was done at Giredmet and used for nuclear physics research and for the construction of the first European experimental nuclear reactor, the F-1. That year, she defended her thesis at the M.V. Lomonosov Institute of Fine Chemical Technonogy, using research from the Radium Institute. In 1945, she headed works at a pilot factory in the city of Elektrostal to manufacture uranium ingots. She was referred to as the "Russian Madame Curie." Seeing the need for a research institute with a wider technical and scientific scope - there were only two institutions (Giredmet and RIAN working with radioisotopes) - she raised the idea with her superiors, initially to the ire of Khlopin. In 1944, the State Defence Committee instigated the Institute of Special Materials (later NII-9, the A. Bochvar All-Russian Research Institute of Inorganic Materials (VNIINM)), under the directorship of colonel-engineer V.B. Shevchenko. Yershova, V.D. Nikolsky and N.S. Povitsky arranged the technical design projects. Yershova was invited with other scientists to see Lavrentiy Beria, the feared Soviet state security chief. He questioned her as she spoke of the uranium production and showed him a sample in a velvet-lined box. Beria said she would be rewarded and she was, promptly and financially.

Yershova was head of the first radiochemical laboratory at NII-9 from the beginning of 1946, and for the next three years this was a critical period, developing technology to process uranium and its nuclear product after irradiation - plutonium (and its products, for nuclear bomb material and research) - and bismuth and its nuclear product after irradiation - polonium (to be a nuclear bomb primer with a high density of neutrons). A pilot factory for producing plutonium - Mayak - was built. From the start of 1947, ingots of uranium irradiated at the F-1 reactor had begun to arrive at the Institute to extract the plutonium. In December 1947, the young female workforce produced the first Soviet plutonium, a mass of 73 microgrammes.

Yershova switched to polonium production in a new laboratory in 1948. 'Wet' technology was developed by Yershova and D.M Ziva (dissolving irradiated bismuth ingots in nitric acid followed by deposition on copper or bismuth powder followed by sublimation in a vacuum) to produce large quantities of polonium-beryllium neutron sources in another new factory. The first Soviet nuclear charge, the RDS-1, was tested in August 1949, using these products. For her contribution, she was awarded the first of her national prizes, the Stalin Prize, the same year. After 1949, she was instructed to produce tritium from the irradiation of lithium to use in the development of the Soviet hydrogen bomb. In 1952, Yershova gained her Ph.D. from the Institute.

In the 1960s, the main area of work for Yershova was tritium production for research on the tritium fuel cycle for reactors and 'installations' (the latter such as KB-11 in the closed city of Sarov). Polonium was used less by nuclear weapons designers but continued to be used for small-scale atomic energy sources. With B.V. Petrov she developed a 'dry' process, vacuum distillation of polonium from irradiated melted bismuth, which was safer and more efficient. Yershova studied the reactions of polonium with many different elements. Her laboratories produced polonium products for electric current generators in communications satellites (Kosmos-84 and Kosmos-90 in 1965) and three thermal blocks (in 1968, 1970 and 1972) for the moon rovers Lunokhod-1 and Lunokhod-2. She was awarded the V.G. Khlopin USSR Academy of Sciences Prize in 1968 for her work on the chemistry of polonium.

She retired from NII-9 after a 40-year career. She died in 1995 and is buried at the Vagankovo Cemetery in Moscow.

Awards
 1949, 1951, 1954: Stalin Prize
 1968: V.G. Khlopin USSR Academy of Sciences Prize

References 

1904 births
1995 deaths
20th-century Russian women scientists
Scientists from Moscow
Stalin Prize winners
Recipients of the Order of the Red Banner of Labour
Theoretical physicists
Soviet women chemists
Soviet women engineers
Soviet women physicists
Women space scientists
Burials at Vagankovo Cemetery